Driscoll Point is a point forming the east side of the entrance to Wise Bay, overlooking the Ross Ice Shelf. It was mapped by the United States Geological Survey from tellurometer surveys (1961–62) and Navy air photos (1960), and was named by the Advisory Committee on Antarctic Names after C.E. Driscoll, Master of the USNS Private Joseph F. Merrell during U.S. Navy Operation Deep Freeze 1963.

References 

Headlands of Antarctica
Shackleton Coast